Phrae United Football Club (Thai: สโมสรฟุตบอลแพร่ยูไนเต็ด) is a Thai semi-professional football club based in Phrae province. They currently play in Thai League 2.

Timeline

History of events of Phrae United Football Club

Stadium and locations by season record

Season by season record

P = Played
W = Games won
D = Games drawn
L = Games lost
F = Goals for
A = Goals against
Pts = Points
Pos = Final position

QR1 = First Qualifying Round
QR2 = Second Qualifying Round
R1 = Round 1
R2 = Round 2
R3 = Round 3
R4 = Round 4

R5 = Round 5
R6 = Round 6
QF = Quarter-finals
SF = Semi-finals
RU = Runners-up
W = Winners

Current squad

Coaching staff

External links 
 
 

Association football clubs established in 2009
Football clubs in Thailand
Sport in Phrae province
2009 establishments in Thailand